Blue Rock is the third and final album released by The Cross. Like Mad, Bad and Dangerous to Know, Blue Rock is a straight rock album which is currently out of print and has become a hard-to-find item. Spike Edney contributed a lot more to the record, writing or co-writing seven of the ten tracks of the album.

Because of the failure of their previous albums, Blue Rock was only released in Germany, Japan, Italy (vinyl only) and France (cassette only). Blue Rock, too, failed to sell many copies. This contributed to the disbanding of The Cross two years later.

Track listing
 "Bad Attitude" (Peter Noone, Clayton Moss, Spike Edney, Josh Macrae, Roger Taylor) – 4:45
 "New Dark Ages" (Roger Taylor) – 4:58
 "Dirty Mind" (Spike Edney) – 3:30
 "Baby It's Alright" (Spike Edney) – 4:06
 "Ain't Put Nothin' Down" (Moss) – 4:30
 "The Also Rans" (Roger Taylor) – 5:27
 "Millionaire" (Moss, Spike Edney, Noone, Macrae) – 3:43
 "Put it All Down to Love" (Spike Edney) – 3:34
 "Hand of Fools" (Noone, Spike Edney) – 4:31
 "Life Changes" (Moss, Noone, Spike Edney, Macrae) – 5:56

Non-Album Track
 "Heartland" (Noone) 4:45

Personnel 
 Roger Taylor – lead vocals
 Spike Edney – keyboards, backing vocals
 Clayton Moss- guitars, backing vocals
 Peter Noone – bass guitar, backing vocals, lead vocals on "Heartland"
 Josh Macrae – drums, backing vocals
Geoffrey Richardson - viola, violin
Helen Liebman - cello
Candy Yates - backing vocals
Clare Yates - backing vocals

References 

1991 albums
The Cross (band) albums